Aleksandr Alekseevich Khvostov (8 January 1857 – 23 November 1921) was an Imperial Russian politician.
After graduating from the Imperial Alexander Lyceum, he entered the Ministry of Justice.

He served as Minister of Justice from July 19, 1915, to July 22, 1916, and was responsible for the trial of Vladimir Sukhomlinov. He became Minister of Interior from July 22, 1916, to September 29, 1916 (New Style).

He was (and became known as) the uncle of Alexei Khvostov.

References

Sources
 Out of My Past: The Memoirs of Count Kokovtsov Edited by H.H. Fisher and translated by Laura Matveev; Stanford University Press, 1935.
 The Memoirs of Count Witte Edited and translated by Sydney Harcave; Sharpe Press, 1990.

1857 births
1922 deaths
Russian monarchists
Interior ministers of Russia
Members of the State Council (Russian Empire)
Aleksandr